Captain Danilo Poblete Vizmanos, PN, Ret. (November 24, 1928 — June 23, 2008) was a Filipino activist and retired captain of the Philippine Navy. He is best known for his resistance against the Martial Law regime of former Philippine President Ferdinand Marcos. On November 30, 2016, Vizmanos' name was engraved on the Wall of Remembrance of the Bantayog ng mga Bayani, which honors the martyrs and heroes who fought against the Marcos dictatorship.

References 

Marcos martial law victims
Individuals honored at the Bantayog ng mga Bayani
Military personnel honored at the Bantayog ng mga Bayani
1928 births
2008 deaths
United States Merchant Marine Academy alumni